Sammy William Walker (born January 20, 1969) is a former professional American football cornerback in the National Football League. He played three seasons for the Pittsburgh Steelers (1991–1992) and the Green Bay Packers (1993–1994). He was selected by the Steelers in the fourth round of the 1991 NFL Draft. He played college football at Texas Tech University.

Walker is one of 15 siblings. He was blinded in ninth grade, while helping his grandmother do some construction, and had laser surgery in 1992.

In 2011, Walker was a defensive coordinator with the indoor football team, Amarillo Venom.

References

1969 births
Living people
People from McKinney, Texas
Players of American football from Texas
American football cornerbacks
Texas Tech Red Raiders football players
Green Bay Packers players
Pittsburgh Steelers players